The Partial Allocation Mechanism (PAM) is a mechanism for truthful resource allocation. It is based on the max-product allocation -  the allocation maximizing the product of agents' utilities (also known as the Nash-optimal allocation or the Proportionally-Fair solution; in many cases it is equivalent to the competitive equilibrium from equal incomes). It guarantees to each agent at least 0.368 of his/her utility in the max-product allocation. It was designed by Cole, Gkatzelis and Goel.

Setting 
There are m resources that are assumed to be homogeneous and divisible.

There are n agents, each of whom has a personal function that attributes a numeric value to each "bundle" (combination of resources). The valuations are assumed to be homogeneous functions.

The goal is to decide what "bundle" to give to each agent, where a bundle may contain a fractional amount of each resource.

Crucially, some resources may have to be discarded, i.e., free disposal is assumed.

Monetary payments are not allowed.

Algorithm 
PAM works in the following way.

 Calculate the max-product allocation; denote it by z.
 For each agent i:
 Calculate the max-product allocation when i is not present.
 Let fi = (the product of the other agents in z) / (the max-product of the other agents when i is not present).
 Give to agent i a fraction fi of each resource he gets in z.

Properties 
PAM has the following properties.

 It is a truthful mechanism - each agent's utility is maximized by revealing his/her true valuations.
 For each agent i, the utility of i is at least 1/e ≈ 0.368 of his/her utility in the max-product allocation.
 When the agents have additive linear valuations, the allocation is envy-free.

PA vs VCG 
The PA mechanism, which does not use payments, is analogous to the VCG mechanism, which uses monetary payments. VCG starts by selecting the max-sum allocation, and then for each agent i it calculates the max-sum allocation when i is not present, and pays i the difference (max-sum when i is present)-(max-sum when i is not present). Since the agents are quasilinear, the utility of i is reduced by an additive factor.

In contrast, PA does not use monetary payments, and the agents' utilities are reduced by a multiplicative factor, by taking away some of their resources.

Optimality 
It is not known whether the fraction of 0.368 is optimal. However, there is provably no truthful mechanism that can guarantee to each agent more than 0.5 of the max-product utility.

Extensions 
The PAM has been used as a subroutine in a truthful cardinal mechanism for one-sided matching.

References 

Fair division protocols
Mechanism design